El Reencuentro: 15 Años Después is the first live album to be released by the Puerto Rican boy band Menudo when they reunited in 1998 under the name El Reencuentro.

Background
In the late 90's, former members of Menudo reunited for a radio special on Sistema 102, a local Puerto Rican radio station. Hundreds of fans gathered outside the radio station that night and the idea kicked off for a one time concert to be held at the Centro de Bellas Artes in Santurce. Ray Reyes was the member that took the idea to the next level, and began contacting members Ricky Meléndez, Johnny Lozada, René Farrait, Miguel Cancel, Charlie Massó and Xavier Serbiá, with Serbiá being the only member to decline participating in the event. Despite the idea of having a concert at Centro de Bellas Artes, response was so big that the band had to move the concert to Coliseo Roberto Clemente and tickets went sold out in less than an hour so it ended up being three consecutive concerts in San Juan and tour around the Americas.

Ray Reyes produced the live album with the rest of the band joining as associate producers in the project. The live recordings used on the album took place during the January 30, 31 and February 1 concerts held at Coliseo Roberto Clemente.

The album was released digitally in the mid 2010s when the band obtained the distribution rights and it was released under NTJ Productions. The digital release includes a bonus track "El Ayer" which is a remake of a Menudo song from the late 70's. The remake was produced by Ignacio Peña, Tony Rijos and Ray Reyes.

Track listing

Personnel
Supporting Band Members
 Amaury Lopez (Keyboards & Music Director)
 Ramon Sánchez (Keyboards)
 Sammy Fisher (Keyboards & Programming)
 Jorge Laboy (Guitars)
 Carlos Rolon (Guitars)
 Ito Serrano (Additional Guitars)
 Ricky Encarnacion (Bass)
 José "Pepe" Jiménez (Drums)
 Eliud Velásquez (Percussion)
 Gustavo Lopez (Trumpet)
 Orlando Zayas (Trumpet)
 Javier Martinez (Trombone)
 Jorge Diaz (Trombone)
 Reinaldo Castellano (Sax)
 Raul Reyes (Chorus)
 Pedro Veaz (Chorus)
 Ricardo Garcia (Chorus)
 Gustavo Parrilla (Chorus)

References

1998 live albums
Menudo (band) albums